Thompson (population 13,678) is the largest city in the Northern Region of Manitoba and is situated along the Burntwood River,  north of Winnipeg.  Originally founded in 1956 as a mining town, it now primarily serves as the "Hub of the North", providing goods and services such as healthcare and retail trade to the surrounding communities.

Thompson's trade area is larger than New Mexico, yet it has fewer than 15,000 residents, with many of the smaller communities accessible only by air or winter road.  Despite its isolated location in the heart of Canada's boreal forest, it is connected to Winnipeg via paved highway, railway (Via Rail), and Thompson Airport. It also has modern amenities, such as fibre optic internet and a large retail scene, including half a dozen shopping malls and several large chain stores (e.g., Walmart, Giant Tiger, Safeway, Shoppers Drug Mart and Canadian Tire).

Thompson's natural and undisturbed surroundings make it popular with outdoor enthusiasts.

History 
The Thompson area was first inhabited by nomadic Paleo-Indian hunters around 6000 BC, sometime after the collapse of the Laurentide Ice Sheet.

For a 10-year period beginning in 1946, Inco Limited explored northern Manitoba for nickel deposits; on February 4, 1956, a major ore body was discovered, and the modern history of Thompson began.

Thompson, named after Inco's chairman at the time, Dr. John F. Thompson (1881–1968), was founded following the December 3, 1956, agreement between the Government of Manitoba and Inco Limited.  On March 25, 1961, Inco formally opened the first integrated nickel mining-smelting-refining plant in the Western Hemisphere (in Thompson) and the second largest nickel-producing operation in the world (after Inco's Sudbury operations).

Thompson was incorporated as a town in 1967 on Canada's Centennial Anniversary; in 1970 Thompson gained city status in the royal presence of Queen Elizabeth II.

The community was initially planned for a population of 8000, but Thompson grew rapidly to 19,001 residents by the 1971 Census; the population has even been estimated as high as 26,000 residents prior to the recession in 1971.  Major layoffs at Inco Limited in 1971 and 1977 led to Thompson's population declining to 14,288 by the 1981 Census.

Thompson's rapid boom and bust was attributed to changes in the nickel market; during the 1960s, following large increases in the demand for nickel, 6 additional mines (Birchtree, Soab North, Soab South, Pipe Number 1, Pipe Number 2, and Pipe Open Pit) were constructed near Thompson.  After the Soviet Union gained access to the world nickel market in 1970, world supply of nickel exceeded world demand; in response, four nickel mines (Soab North, Soab South, Pipe Number 1, and Pipe Number 2) were closed in 1971 and 30% of Inco's workforce in Thompson was laid off.  In 1977, when nickel prices declined substantially, a fifth mine (Birchtree) was put on care and maintenance and an additional 650 Inco employees in Thompson were laid off. 

As Inco's workforce dwindled from over 4000 in the 1970s to around 850 in 2018, the economic driver of Thompson shifted to providing goods and services (e.g., retail, healthcare, social services) to the surrounding communities, earning Thompson the nickname, "The Hub of the North".

Geography 

Thompson covers an area of 20.79 square kilometers (8.03 square miles) and is located on the Precambrian Canadian Shield.

The city is surrounded by boreal forest and bordered on the west and north by the Burntwood River.

Ecology – flora 
Thompson is located on the border of plant hardiness zones 1a and 1b, making outdoor commercial agriculture impossible; for comparison, Winnipeg is located within zone 4a.

The dominant coniferous species are white spruce (Picea glauca), black spruce (Picea mariana), jack pine (Pinuus banksiana), tamarack (Larix laricina) and balsam fir (Abies balsamea). White birch (Betula papyrifera) is the most common deciduous species.

Ecology – fauna 

Hundreds of ravens (Corvus corax), known locally as "Thompson Turkeys", reside in Thompson year-round.  Many bird species visit Thompson and area in the summer to breed, such as herring gulls (Larus smithsonianus), bald eagles (Haliaeetus leucocephalus), golden eagles (Aquila chrysaetos), sandhill cranes (Antigone canadensis), and common terns (Sterna hirundo).

Beavers (Castor canadensis) are ubiquitous around Thompson, with a few residing in the city limits.  Red foxes (Vulpes vulpes) can also be found in Thompson.  Black bears (Ursus americanus), and less commonly, wolves (Canis lupus), are occasionally spotted on the fringes of town.  Moose (Alces alces) and herds of boreal woodland caribou (Rangifer tarandus caribou) can also occasionally be seen near Thompson.  Rarely seen predators outside of Thompson include the marten (Martes americana), the wolverine (Gulo gulo), and the lynx (Lynx canadensis).

Climate
Thompson is marked by a subarctic climate (Köppen Dfc), with long cold winters and short warm summers.

A majority of the annual precipitation of  falls from June to September.

Culture
The Thompson Regional Community Centre contains two indoor skating rinks, a large 6-sheet curling rink called the Burntwood Curling Club, a gymnasium, exercise facilities, and a walking track.

Attractions within Thompson / tourism 
Spirit Way is a 2 km (1.25 mi) walking and biking pathway with 16 points of interest that highlight Thompson's art, heritage, culture, industry, geology, and scenery; the pathway includes the largest photo-real mural in Canada and 56 painted wolf statues.

The Heritage North Museum offers the opportunity to see animals native to the area, a boreal forest diorama, First Nation and fur trade artifacts (including an authentic caribou hide tipi), fossils, and mining artifacts.  The Museum consists of two log structures, an open-air blacksmith shop, Institutional Archives, and visitor information booth.

The Millennium Trail is a  hike and bike loop around the city with sections that pass through the boreal forest. The crushed rock trail is open year-round to non-motorized travel. Walking, hiking and mountain biking are popular in the summer while walking and cross country skiing are winter favourites.

Attractions around Thompson / tourism 
Parks Manitoba offers dozens of campsites for rent, while Paint Lake Lodge runs the largest marina in Manitoba and offers cabin, boat, and canoe rentals, a restaurant, and a convenience store. Some features of the park include boat launches, beaches, playgrounds, a volleyball court, baseball diamond and fitness trail. In the winter there are groomed snowmobile trails, ice skating, toboggan runs, ice fishing and ice fishing derbies.

Kwasitchewan Falls, Manitoba's highest waterfall, is viewable after hiking an  trail (The Pisew Falls to Kwasitchewan Falls Trail); this trail is a difficult back-country trail, recommended for experienced hikers only.

Events 
Nickel Days is a large weekend festival held in June every year; the festival includes concerts, family games, a parade, and more.

National Indigenous Peoples Day celebrations are held on June 21 each year.

Winterfest is an annual multi-day celebration of northern culture and activities that is held in February.

Sports 
Thompson is home to the Norman Northstars hockey team, who play in the Manitoba U-18 'AAA' Hockey League. Thompson's minor hockey teams are known as the King Miners.  The high school teams are called the RD Parker Collegiate Trojans. The Trojans' rivals are the Hapnot Kopper Kings from Flin Flon and the MBCI Spartans from The Pas.

Every year in April, students from the six elementary schools in grades 3–8 compete in the Knights of Columbus Track Meet. Juniper School dominated KoC in the 1990s, and Westwood School has had a winning streak during the 2000s (decade).

Media 
The Thompson Citizen (covering Thompson) and the Nickel Belt News (covering the area around Thompson) are the only local newspapers.

There are five radio stations: AM 610: CHTM (adult contemporary), FM 102.9: CHTM (adult contemporary), FM 96.3: CINC-FM (NCI), FM 99.9: CKSB-5 (Première Chaîne; repeats CKSB Winnipeg), and FM 100.9: CBWK (CBC Radio One).

Shaw Communications is the local cable television provider serving Thompson, and operates the local Shaw TV channel on cable channel 11.

Economy

Overview 

The economy of Thompson is centred around nickel mining and providing goods and services to the surrounding communities in both Census Division No. 22 (in which Thompson is located) and Census Division No. 23; these two Census Divisions have a combined population of 51,136, which includes over 38,000 First Nations people.  Thompson is by far the largest community in either of these Census Divisions, with the next largest community being Norway House Cree Nation (population 4927).

As is common in resource-based communities, Thompson has experienced above-average employment income and significant swings in mining-sector employment throughout its history.

The median employment income in 2015 for full-year full-time workers in Thompson was $65,262; this was 22% higher than the Canadian median of $53,431.

Thompson's unemployment rate in 2016 was 7.6%, slightly below the Canadian average of 7.7%.

As of the 2016 Census, Thompson had 7065 employed persons, with the five largest sectors of the economy being:

 mining (1255 employees)
 health care and social assistance (1100 employees)
 accommodation and food services (710 employees)
 educational services (710 employees)
 retail trade (670 employees)

Between the 2016 Census and 2018, approximately 400 job losses have occurred in the mining industry.

Mining 

Vale Limited is the owner and operator of Thompson's mining operations, which involves the mining, milling, and concentrating of nickel; the concentrated nickel slurry is then shipped (for final processing) to Vale Limited's operations in Long Harbour and Sudbury.

Founded on a large and high-grade deposit of nickel, Thompson accounted for 11% of the world's finished nickel production in 1962, having produced over 40,800 metric tonnes of nickel that year; Thompson's nickel production peaked in 1970 and 1971 at over 60,000 metric tonnes (per year) and has since declined to 23,000 metric tonnes in 2017.

Despite the fact that Vale Limited's placed their nearby Birchtree Mine on care and maintenance (suspending nickel extraction at the mine for the time being), Thompson may be particularly well positioned for future growth in nickel mining industry: Vale recently invested over $100 million in the concentrate load out facility and Vale's North Atlantic mining operations director Alistair Ross recently stated that, "If you were to look across the world for an area that had nickel that could be invested in on a standalone nickel basis, there isn’t a better place [than Thompson]".

Health care and social assistance 
The Northern Regional Health Authority (Eastern Campus) provides health care services to most of the communities in Census Division No. 22 and Census Division No. 23; Thompson-based facilities include the Thompson General Hospital, Northern Spirit Manor (personal care home), the Thompson Clinic, and Hope North (centre for youth in crisis).

Addictions Foundation of Manitoba also has a facility located in Thompson.

Accommodation and food services 
Thompson has eight hotels, including Best Western, Days Inn, and Quality Inn, which have over 600 beds (total).

There are over 20 restaurants in Thompson including Boston Pizza, Pizza Hut, KFC, and McDonald's.

Educational services 
The School District of Mystery Lake, based in Thompson, provides K–12 education through six primary schools and one secondary school; the Franco-Manitoban School Division also operates one school for K–8.

The University College of the North and the University of Manitoba's "Northern Social Work Program" provides post-secondary education centered around nursing, social work, and the trades.

The Northern Manitoba Sector Council provides essential skills and employment skills training to Northern Manitobans.

The Frontier School Division, the largest school division in Canada by geographical area, has an Area Office in Thompson.

Retail trade 
Thompson's retail trade is centered mostly in several malls, such as:

City Centre Mall, which includes a Wal-Mart, Safeway, TD Canada, and Tim Hortons.
Burntwood Plaza, which includes Shoppers Drug Mart and RBC Financial.
 Plaza Shopping Centre, which includes a Canadian Tire and Family Foods.
Westwood Mall, which includes a Giant Tiger.

Other

Transportation 
The city is served by Thompson Airport, which is the third-busiest airport in Manitoba and provides Thompson with several hundred jobs.

First Nations organizations 
Thompson has several advocacy, non-profit, and administrative organizations focused around First Nations people, including Manitoba Keewatinowi Okimakanak Inc. (MKO), Awasis Agency of Northern Manitoba, Keewatin Tribal Council, and Ma-Mow-We-Tak Friendship Centre.

Twenty-four governments, businesses, and non-profit organizations are partners to the Thompson Aboriginal Accord, originally signed in 2009, outlining a common understanding towards equitable economic development and reconciliation.

Cold weather testing 
MDS Aerotest currently operates a cold weather testing centre just south of Thompson, as part of a joint venture between Pratt & Whitney Canada and Rolls-Royce.  Thompson was selected from an initial list of 150 candidate communities due to the area's ideal testing conditions and urban amenities.

Demographics 

In the 2021 Census of Population conducted by Statistics Canada, Thompson had a population of 13,035 living in 4,676 of its 5,442 total private dwellings, a change of −4.7% from its 2016 population of 13,678.

The number of residents fell substantially between 1971 and 1981, from 19,001 to 14,288 (a 24.8% decrease). Since then, Thompson's population has fluctuated between 13,000 and 15,000 people.

Ethnicity 
In 2016, people with European ancestry (43.9%) made up a plurality of the population, followed closely by Aboriginals (43.5%), composed of First Nations (32.2%) and Metis (10.8%); the remainder of the population is made up of visible minorities (12.5%), with the largest two visible minorities being South Asian (7.5%) and Black (2.1%).

In 2016, Thompson has the highest percentage of its population as Aboriginal (43.5%) out of all 152 cities (census metropolitan areas and census agglomerations) in Canada.

Language 
The most common mother tongues are English (81.3%), followed by Cree (5.2%), Punjabi (2.6%), and Gujarati (2.0%).

Other 
The median age in Thompson is 30.8 years old, significantly below Canada's median age of 41.0.

For Thompson residents ages 25 to 34, 17.5% have not obtained a high-school diploma or equivalent, compared to 8.7% for Canada.

Government
The City of Thompson is governed by a city council consisting of 9 members: a mayor (head of council) and eight councillors; the structure and size of the municipal government is stipulated by The Thompson Charter Act. Elections are held every four years (in October) and members of city council serve four-year terms (without term limits).

After the 2018 election, the members of city council were: Colleen Smook (Mayor), Les Ellesworth, Kathy Valentino, Jeff Fountain, Brian Lundmark, Earl Colbourne, Duncan Wong, and Judy Kolada. Council candidates Chiew Chong and Andre Proulx tied for the ninth seat in 2018, and Proulx won the final seat following a by-election in 2019.

As of 2018, the City of Thompson has eight standing committees, each composed of two or three members of the council, private citizens, and business/government representatives.

Crime
In both 2018 and 2019, Thompson was #2 on the Crime Severity Index of Canada. To calculate the actual Crime Severity Index, the number of police-reported incidents for each offence is multiplied by the weight for that offence.  All weighted offences are then added together and divided by the corresponding population total.

Finally, to make the Index easier to interpret, the Index is standardized to "100" for Canada (a system that is similar to the Consumer Price Index), using 2006 as a base year.For hub cities (e.g., Thompson), the Crime Severity Index likely over-represents the dangers of crime to the regular citizen. In 2018, the RCMP officer in charge of Thompson, Kevin Lewis, stated, "... Thompson is the hub of Northern Manitoba, which makes it a desirable place for drug trafficking, and other nefarious activities. This is a common theme for hub cities across Canada. Our proactive drug enforcement also provides an increase in the CSI, as cocaine trafficking is weighted heavily on the CSI. Disturbing the peace is similar to mischief where intoxication occurs in a public place, resulting in many violations due to the downtown core, again weighing heavily on our score." Lewis also stated, "... Many of our mischiefs are related to intoxicated persons in a private residence or hotel room, but can also be used to capture damage to property. The mischief rate is high and when the weight is applied, it provides a high ratio for our CSI score.”

Court Circuit 
Thompson is unique in being the judicial centre for a huge geographic area, ranging from Norway House in the South to Churchill in the North. The Thompson Judicial district covers 15 circuits and offers both Judicial Justice of the Peace Court as well as Provincial Court sittings.  Judges, Judicial Justices of the Peace, Clerks, Crown Attorneys and defence lawyers based in Thompson and Winnipeg regularly travel by small plane on circuit court to various remote communities and First Nation Communities to hold Provincial court.

Education

The School District of Mystery Lake operates six Elementary Schools (Deerwood School, Burntwood School, Westwood School, École Riverside School, Juniper School, Wapanohk Community School) and one High School (R. D. Parker Collegiate).  The district offers a K–12 French immersion program: grades K–8 at École Riverside School and grades 9–12 at RD Parker Collegiate. The district also offers a K–8 language education program in the Cree language at the Wapanohk Community School. Students can continue the French program at the high school if they completed K–8 at Riverside and there are basic Cree courses in grades 9–12 offered as well. R. D. Parker Collegiate also offers grade 10 and 11 courses in Native Studies and a grade 12 Native Law course. Full Cree-medium education does not, however, extend to the high school yet.

Since September 2009, the Franco-Manitoban School Division (DSFM) has expanded within Manitoba to include one K–8 elementary school in Thompson, École Communautaire La Voie du Nord. Located on Weir Road near the site of the Norplex Pool Recreation Centre, the district allows children to receive instruction in French with peers in a Francophone culture.

Thompson is home to one of the two main campuses of the University College of the North, as well as the University of Manitoba's Faculty of Social Work branch in the region.

Notable people 

Niki Ashton, politician
Steve Ashton, politician
Kelly Bindle, politician
Rod Bruinooge, politician
Jeremy Cumpston, doctor
Brenda Davidson, curler
Lorna deBlicquy, aviator
Bev Desjarlais, politician
Bob Desjarlais, labour leader
Amelia Douglas, trapper
Deven Green, performer
Kaitlyn Jones, curler
Tina Keeper, actress
Curtis Leschyshyn, NHL player
Cameron Mann, NHL player
Lata Pada, dancer
Tina Poitras, Olympic race walker
Eric Redhead, politician
Corey Redekop, writer
Kate Rice, prospector
Mario Santos, politician
Jennifer Saunders, former Canadian women's racquetball champion
Jody Shelley, NHL player
Diana Swain, journalist
Kevin Tkachuk, rugby player

In pop culture

 The city was used in the Tragically Hip song "Thompson Girl". The song is both set in, and around Thompson, Manitoba, and is about the title character, a girl who dated the drummer for 2 years.
 "Thompson" is a song by Les Surveillantes, found on their album titled La racine carrée du coeur.

References

External links

 
Cities in Manitoba
Mining communities in Manitoba
Populated places established in 1956